Dave Hill (born 1946) is an English guitarist associated with the band Slade.

Dave Hill may also refer to:

 Dave Hill (athlete) (born 1952), Canadian Olympic athlete
 Dave Hill (baseball) (born 1937), American Major League Baseball pitcher
 Dave Hill (golfer) (1937–2011), American golfer
 Dave Hill (American football) (born 1941), American football player
 Dave Hill (automotive engineer) (born 1943), American automotive engineer
 Dave Hill (professor) (born 1945), British socialist activist and writer 
 Dave Hill (actor) (born 1945), British actor
 Dave Hill (rugby league), rugby league footballer who played in the 1960s and 1970s for Bradford Northern
 Dave Hill (footballer) (born 1966), English footballer and football manager
 Dave Hill (comedian) (active 1994 and after), American comedian and musician
 Dave Hill (screenwriter) (born 1984), American screenwriter

See also 
 David Hill (disambiguation)
 Hill (surname)